Mallika Sengupta (1960–2011) was a Bengali poet, feminist, and reader of Sociology from Kolkata, known for her "unapologetically political poetry".

Biography 
Mallika Sengupta was the head of the Department of Sociology in Maharani Kasiswari College, an undergraduate college affiliated with the University of Calcutta in Kolkata. She was much better known for her literary activity. The author of more than 20 books including 14 volumes of poetry and two novels, she was widely translated and was a frequent invitee at international literary festivals.

For twelve years in the 90s she was the poetry editor of Sananda, the largest circulated Bengali fortnightly (edited by Aparna Sen). Along with her husband, the noted poet Subodh Sarkar, she was the founder-editor of Bhashanagar, a culture magazine in Bengali.

English translations of her work have appeared in various Indian and American anthologies. In addition to teaching, editing and writing, she was actively involved with the cause of gender justice and other social issues.

A victim of breast cancer, she was under treatment since October 2005 and died on 28 May 2011.

Activism and literary themes

Sengupta was also active in a number of protest and gender activism groups. Her fiery, combative tone is noticeable in many poems, e.g. "While teaching my son history": 
 Man alone was both God and Goddess
 Man was both father and mother
 Both tune and flute
 Both penis and vagina
 As we have learnt from history.

  – from Mallika Sengupta, Kathamanabi, Bhashanagar, kolkata, 2005, (tr. poet)
often dealing with women's marginalised role in history:
after the battle said chenghis khan
the greatest pleasure of life,
is in front of the vanquished enemy
to sleep with his favourite wife.

   – Juddha Sheshe Nari    – from Mallika Sengupta, Kathamanabi, Bhashanagar, kolkata, 2005, (tr. amitabha mukerjee)

Particularly evocative is her feminist rendition of the legend of Khana, a medieval female poet whose tongue was allegedly cut off by her jealous
husband: 
 In Bengal in the Middle Ages
 Lived a woman Khana, I sing her life
 The first Bengali woman poet
 Her tongue they severed with a knife
 Her speechless voice, "Khanar Bachan"
 Still resonates in the hills and skies
 Only the poet by the name of Khana
 Bleeding she dies.

   – Khana, tr. amitabha mukerjee

Awards and honours 

Junior Fellowship for Literature from the Dept. of Culture, Govt. of India (1997–99)
Sukanto Puroskar from the Govt. of West Bengal (1998)
Bangla Academy award from the Govt. of West Bengal (2004)
Has been invited to poetry readings, conferences and seminars in Sweden (1987), Australia (1994), USA (2002 & 2006), Czech Republic (2009) and Bangladesh (1998 & 2002) as part of Indian writer's delegation.

Works

Poetry

 Challish Chander Ayu, Virus publication, 1983
 Ami Sindhur Meye, Prativas publication, Kolkata, 1988
 Haghare O Debdasi, Prativas publication, Kolkata, 1991
 Ardhek Prithivi, Ananda Publishers, Kolkata, 1993, 
 Meyeder Aa Aaa Ka Kha, Prativas publication, Kolkata, 1998
 Kathamanabi, Ananda Publishers, Kolkata, 1999, 
 Deoyalir Rat, Patralekha, Kolkata, 2001
 Amra Lasya Amra Ladai, Sristi Prakashani, Kolkata, 2001 Book Excerptise (2 translations)
 Purushke Lekha Chithi, Ananda Publishers, Kolkata, 2003,  Book Excerptise (1 poem online)
 Chheleke History Parate Giye, Ananda Publishers, Kolkata, 2005
 Shrestha Kabita, Kolkata, Dey's Publication, 2005
 Aamake Sariye Dao Valobasa, Ananda Publishers, Kolkata, 2006, 
 Purusher Janyo Eksho Kabita, Deep Prakashan, Kolkata, 2007
 O Janemon Jibananada, Banolata Sen Likhchhi, Kolkata, Ananda Pub. 2008
 Brishtimichhil Barudmichhil, Kolkata, Ananda Pub. 2010

Poetry in English translation

 Carriers of Fire, Bhashanagar, Kolkata, 2002
 Kathamanabi, her voice and Other Poems, Bhashanagar, kolkata, 2005

Novels 
 Seetayan, Ananda Publishers, Kolkata, 1995, 
 Sleelatahanir Pare, Ananda Publishers, Kolkata, 1996,  
 Kabir Bouthan, Ananda Publishers, Kolkata, 2011,

Books on sociology of gender 
 Strilinga Nirmana, Ananda Publishers, Kolkata, 1994, 
 Purush Noi Purushtantra, Vikash Grantha Bhavan, Kolkata, 2002
 Bibahabichchhinnar Akhyan, Banglar Samaj O Sahitye, Kolkata, Papyrus, 2007

Translation 
 Akaler Madhye Saras, translation from Kedarnath Singh's Hindi poems, Sahitya Akademi, Kolkata, 1998

Bengali poetry anthology 
 Dui Banglar Meyeder Shreshtha kabita, Upasana, Kolkata, 2003

References

External links 
 Mallika Sengupta and the Poetry of Feminist Conviction.  (4 bilingual poems)
 The unsevered tongue: modern poetry by Bengali women, tr. amitabha mukerjee.  Nandimukh samsad, kolkata, 2005. (4 poems with translations, excerpts)

20th-century Bengali poets
Indian feminists
1960 births
2011 deaths
Bengali Hindus
20th-century Bengalis
21st-century Bengalis
Bengali writers
Bengali poets
21st-century Bengali poets
Bengali female poets
Academic staff of the University of Calcutta
Writers from Kolkata
Poets from West Bengal
20th-century Indian women writers
20th-century Indian social scientists
21st-century Indian women writers
21st-century Indian social scientists
20th-century Indian educational theorists
21st-century Indian poets
20th-century Indian poets
20th-century Indian writers
20th-century Indian novelists
20th-century Indian essayists
21st-century Indian writers
21st-century Indian novelists
21st-century Indian essayists
21st-century Indian educational theorists
20th-century Indian educators
21st-century Indian educators
Indian educators
Indian women educators
Indian novelists
Indian women novelists
Indian essayists
Indian women essayists
Indian women poets
Indian writers
Indian poets
Indian sociologists
Indian feminist writers
Indian educational theorists
Indian women educational theorists
Indian women sociologists
Indian editors
Indian women editors
Indian magazine editors
Indian political writers
Scientists from West Bengal
Women scientists from West Bengal
People from Nadia district
Women educators from West Bengal
Educators from West Bengal
20th-century women educators